Andy Kubiszewski (born September 30, 1961) is an American musician, songwriter, remixer and producer. He has worked with bands Exotic Birds and Stabbing Westward, contributed to several other bands, and composed music for TV shows and films.

Work

Discographies

Rock
 1984 | Exotic Birds | Exotic Birds | Songwriter, Vocals, Guitar, Percussion
 1986 | Exotic Birds | L'oiseau | Songwriter, Vocals, Guitar, Percussion
 1989 | Exotic Birds | Equilibrium (Pleasureland) | Songwriter, Vocals, Guitar, Percussion
 1990 | Exotic Birds | Equilibrium (Alpha International) | Songwriter, Vocals, Guitar, Percussion
 1993 | The The | Dis-Infected | Drums
 1994 | The The | Solitude | Drums
 1994 | Nine Inch Nails | The Downward Spiral | Drums
 1995 | Prick | Prick | Drums
 1996 | Stabbing Westward | Wither Blister Burn & Peel | Songwriter, Drums, Guitar, Programming, Background Vocals
 1998 | Stabbing Westward | Darkest Days | Songwriter, Drums, Keyboards, Additional Vocals, Guitar
 2001 | Stabbing Westward | Stabbing Westward | Songwriter, Drums, Vibraphone, Marimba, Keyboards, Acoustic Guitar
 2002 | Twinstar | Twinstar | Drums, Loops, Sequences
 2003 | Darling Waste | Truth About Lies | Drums
 2003 | The Margot Catcher | Middle of the Blue | Drums
 2004 | State of Being | Haywire | Production, Drums
 2004 | Lucky Pierre | ThinKing | Drums, Co-producer
 2005 | Andrea Summer | Lifeblood | Drums
 2005 | Darling Waste | Manifest Destiny Rebellion | Drums
 2005 | The Margot Catcher | The Line is a Dot | Drums
 2005 | t.A.T.u. | Dangerous and Moving | Songwriter, Production, Drums - Loves Me Not
 2005 | KOTO | " What's Up?" | Songwriter, Drums, Guitar
 2005 | DOOM | Original Motion Picture Soundtrack | Drums
 2006 | t.A.T.u. | "The Best" | Songwriter, Production, Drums - "Loves Me Not"
 2008 | Death Sentence | Original Motion Picture Soundtrack | "A Message" songwriter/performer - remix by Charlie Clouser
 2008 | t.A.T.u. | Vesyolye Ulybki | Songwriter - "You and I"
 2009 | (sic) | (sic) | Drums, arranger
 2009 | Darling Waste | I Am Born | Drums
 2020 | Discothèque | EP 1 | Songwriter - Producer - Modular Synthesizer
 2020 | Cities and Empires | Cities and Empires | Songwriter - Producer - Modular Synthesizers - Drums - Background vocals
 2021 | Discothèque | EP 2.0 | Songwriter - Producer - Modular Synthesizer
 2021 | Discothèque | REMIXED EP | Songwriter - Producer - Modular Synthesizer
 2022 | Discothèque | Moments of Madness - single | Songwriter - Producer - Modular Synthesizer

Jazz/New Age
 Jim Brickman, By Heart Windham Hill
 La Vienta/Jazz Menco, Telarc International
 Travelin' Light: Sam Pilafian and Frank Vignola, Makin' Whoopee Telarc International
 Travelin' Light: Sam Pilafian and Frank Vignola, Christmas with Travelin' Light Telarc International
 Santa's Bag, (Various Artists) An All-Star Jazz Christmas Telarc International

Educational
 2007 | "habla blah blah" | Educational CD |Composer, Producer, Multi- Instrumentalist
 2008 | "habla blah blah" volume 2 | Educational CD |Composer, Producer, Multi- Instrumentalist

Awards
2015 BMI TV MUSIC AWARD - Original underscore and Theme for "MARRIED TO THE JOB"
2011 BMI TV MUSIC AWARD - Original underscore and Theme for "STORAGE WARS"
2011 BMI TV MUSIC AWARD - Original underscore and Theme for "THE COLONY"

TV and film scores
2022 - "STORAGE WARS" - Season 14 ( TV Series Documentary )- composer - A&E
2021 - "STORAGE WARS" - Season 13 ( TV Series Documentary )- composer - A&E
2021 - "MONSTER GARAGE" - Season 6 reboot ( TV Series Documentary )- composer - DISCOVERY  CHANNEL
2019 - “POSE” - Season 2 ( TV Series )- additional music - FX
2019 - “EUPHORIA” - Season 1 ( TV Series )- composer - additional music - HBO
2019 - “AXMEN” - Season 10 ( TV Series Documentary )- composer - HISTORY CHANNEL
2018 - "THE RETURN OF SHELBY THE SWAMP MAN" - Season 1 ( TV Series Documentary )- composer - HISTORY CHANNEL
2018 - "BUSH LEAGUE BUILD-OFF" - Season 1 ( TV Series Documentary )- composer - HISTORY CHANNEL
2018 - "STORAGE WARS" - Season 12 ( TV Series Documentary )- composer - A&E
2017 - "STORAGE WARS" - Season 11 ( TV Series Documentary )- composer - A&E
2017 - "STORAGE WARS" - Season 10 ( TV Series Documentary )- composer - A&E
2017 - "FIRE CHASERS" ( Documentary )- composer - NETFLIX
2017 - "TWO DEGREES" - 2 Hr Special ( TV Series Documentary )- composer - HISTORY CHANNEL
2017 - "STORAGE WARS" - Season 9 ( TV Series Documentary )- composer - A&E
2016 - "DEADLIEST CATCH - DUNGENESS COVE" - Season 1 ( TV Series Documentary )- composer - DISCOVERY CHANNEL
2015 - "BADLANDS -TEXAS" - Season 1 ( TV Series Documentary )- composer - NATIONAL GEOGRAPHIC CHANNEL
2015 - "APPALACHIAN OUTLAWS" - Season 2 ( TV Series Documentary )- composer - HISTORY CHANNEL
2015 - "AXMEN" - Season 9 ( TV Series Documentary )- composer - HISTORY CHANNEL
2015 - "AXMEN" - Season 8 ( TV Series Documentary )- composer - HISTORY CHANNEL
2015 - "MARRIED TO THE JOB" - Season 1 ( TV Series Documentary )- composer - A&E
2015 - "STORAGE WARS" - Season 8 ( TV Series Documentary )- composer - A&E
2015 - "STORAGE WARS" - Season 7 ( TV Series Documentary )- composer - A&E
2015 - "STORAGE WARS" - Season 6 ( TV Series Documentary )- composer - A&E
2014 - "STORAGE WARS" - Season 5 ( TV Series Documentary )- composer - A&E
2014 - "BARRY'D TREASURE" - Season 1 ( TV Series Documentary )- composer - A&E
2014 - "OFF ROADS WARRIORS - ALASKA" - Season 1 ( TV Series Documentary )- composer - HISTORY CHANNEL
2014 - "APPALACHIAN OUTLAWS" - Season 1 ( TV Series Documentary )- composer - HISTORY CHANNEL
2014 - "MISSISSIPPI MEN" - Season 1 ( TV Series Documentary )- composer - A&E
2013 - "THE LEGEND OF SHELBY THE SWAMP MAN" - Season 1 ( TV Series Documentary )- composer - HISTORY CHANNEL
2013 - "AXMEN" - Season 7 ( TV Series Documentary )- composer - HISTORY CHANNEL
2013 - "AXMEN" - Season 6 ( TV Series Documentary )- composer - HISTORY CHANNEL
2013 - "STORAGE WARS NEW YORK" - Season 1 ( TV Series )- composer - A&E
2013 - "AMERICAN HOGGERS" - Season 3 ( TV Series Documentary )- composer - A&E
2013 - "STORAGE WARS TEXAS" - Season 3 ( TV Series Documentary )- composer - A&E
2013 - "STORAGE WARS" - Season 4 ( TV Series )- composer - A&E
2012 - "GUTTERSNIPE" ( Short )- composer
2012 - "AMERICA'S LOST TREASURES" ( TV Series Documentary )- composer - NATIONAL GEOGRAPHIC CHANNEL
2012 - "AMERICAN HOGGERS" - Season 2 ( TV Series Documentary )- composer - A&E
2012 - "STORAGE WARS TEXAS" - Season 2 ( TV Series Documentary )- composer - A&E
2012 - "STORAGE WARS" - Season 3 ( TV Series )- composer - A&E
2011 - "COAL" ( TV Series Documentary )- composer - SPIKE TV
2011 - "STORAGE WARS" - Season 2 ( TV Series )- composer - A&E
2011 - "ALASKAN MONSTER HUNT: Hillstranded" ( TV Series Documentary )- composer - DISCOVERY CHANNEL
2011 - "INSPECTOR AMERICA" ( TV Series Documentary )- composer - HISTORY CHANNEL
2011 - "AMERICAN HOGGERS" - Season 1( TV Series Documentary )- composer - A&E
2011 - "AXMEN" - Season 5 ( TV Series Documentary )- composer - HISTORY CHANNEL
2011 - "STORAGE WARS TEXAS" - Season 1( TV Series Documentary )- composer - A&E
2011 - "BLACK GOLD" - Season 3 ( TV Series Documentary )- composer - TRU TV
2010 - "STORAGE WARS"  - Season 1 ( TV Series Documentary )- composer - A&E
2010 - "THE COLONY" - Season 2( TV Series Documentary )- composer - DISCOVERY CHANNEL
2010 - "SWORDS- LIFE ON THE LINE" - Season 3 ( TV Series Documentary )- composer - DISCOVERY CHANNEL
2010 - "AXMEN" - Season 4 ( TV Series Documentary )- composer - HISTORY CHANNEL
2009 - "THE LOCATOR" - Season 3 ( TV Series Documentary )- composer - WE TV
2009 - "AXMEN" - Season 3 ( TV Series Documentary )- composer - HISTORY CHANNEL
2009 - "THE COLONY" - Season 1( TV Series Documentary )- composer - DISCOVERY CHANNEL
2008 - "AXMEN" - Season 2 ( TV Series Documentary )- composer - HISTORY CHANNEL
2008 - "AMERICA'S TOUGHEST JOBS ( TV Series Documentary )- composer - NBC
2008 - "LA HARDHATS" ( TV Series Documentary )- composer - HISTORY CHANNEL
2008 - " 1000 WAYS TO DIE" - ( TV Series Pilot ) - composer - SPIKE TV
2008 - "AMERICA'S PORT"  ( TV Series Documentary )- composer - HISTORY CHANNEL
2007 - "TWISTER SISTERS"  ( TV Series Documentary )- composer - HISTORY CHANNEL
2007 - "SO YOU'VE DOWNLOADED A DEMON" ( Film ) - composer
2007 - "MORE CRAZY CHRISTMAS LIGHTS" ( TV Series Documentary ) - composer
2006 - "JAM" ( Film ) - composer
2006 - "MONSTER GARAGE" - Season 5 ( TV Series Documentary )- composer - DISCOVERY  CHANNEL
2006 - "CRAZY CHRISTMAS LIGHTS" ( TV Series Documentary ) - composer
2005 - "MONSTER GARAGE" - Season 4 ( TV Series Documentary )- composer - DISCOVERY  CHANNEL
2004 - "MONSTER GARAGE" - Season 3 ( TV Series Documentary )- composer - DISCOVERY  CHANNEL
1998 - "FIVE O'CLOCK SHADOW" ( Short ) - co-composer

References

1961 births
Living people
American male classical composers
American classical composers
American rock drummers
Songwriters from South Carolina
Record producers from South Carolina
American industrial musicians
Cleveland Institute of Music alumni
American jazz drummers
Alternative rock drummers
American new wave musicians
American synth-pop musicians
Stabbing Westward members
20th-century American drummers
American male drummers
Prick (band) members
20th-century American male musicians
American male jazz musicians
Exotic Birds members
American male songwriters